Big Splash could refer to:

The Big Splash (book), (1990) by Louis A. Frank and Patrick Huyghe
The Big Splash, a 1935 British comedy film
Big Splash, an alternate name for the giant impact hypothesis for the formation of the Moon
Jo Brand's Big Splash, a British television programme
Big Splash, a professional wrestling attack

Places
Big Splash Waterpark Canberra
Big Splash, Singapore, a former waterpark, turned into a dining and recreation complex, demolished in 2017

See also
A Bigger Splash, 1967 painting by David Hockney
A Bigger Splash (1974 film), a biographical film about David Hockney